Colotis eris, the banded gold tip or black-barred gold tip, is a butterfly of the family Pieridae. It is found in the Afrotropical realm.

The wingspan is 40–45 mm. The adults have fly year-round in warm areas, peaking from March to June.

The larvae feed on Boscia albitrunca and Boscia oleoides.

Subspecies
The following subspecies are recognised:
C. e. eris (Sub-Saharan Africa, including Mauritania, Senegal, Gambia, Mali, northern Nigeria, Sudan, Kenya, Zambia, Namibia, Zimbabwe, Botswana, Mozambique, South Africa, Eswatini)
C. e. contractus Gabriel, 1937-38 (Yemen, Oman)
?C. e. johnstoni (Butler, 1886)

References

Seitz, A. Die Gross-Schmetterlinge der Erde 13: Die Afrikanischen Tagfalter. Plate XIII 15 as johnstoni

Butterflies described in 1857
eris